This list of University of Chicago Booth School of Business faculty contains long-term faculty members and temporary academic staffs of the University of Chicago Booth School of Business. The long-term faculty members consists of tenure/tenure-track and equivalent academic positions, while that of temporary academic staffs consists of lecturers (without tenure), postdoctoral researchers, visiting professors or scholars (visitors), and equivalent academic positions.

Economics and finance
 Robert Z. Aliber, developer of the Program of International Studies in Business and the Center for Studies in International Finance
Harry Gideonse (1901-1985), President of Brooklyn College, and Chancellor of the New School for Social Research
 Erik Hurst, V. Duane Rath Professor Of Economics ; deputy director of the Becker Friedman Institute, And John E. Jeuck faculty fellow
 Gary Becker, Nobel Prize–winning economist, considered to have coined "human capital" and "rotten kid theorem," known for price theory 
 Marianne Bertrand, Chris P. Dialynas Professor of Economics
 Ronald Coase, Nobel Prize–winning economist, known for work in contract theory
 Eugene Fama, “Man Who Launched Modern Finance” - Nobel Prize–winning financial economist and originator of the efficient-market hypothesis and co-originator of Fama & French Three Factors Model (also alumnus, M.B.A. and Ph.D.)
 Robert Fogel, Nobel Prize–winning economist, known for work in population economics
 Matthew Gentzkow – Richard O. Ryan Professor of Economics and Neubauer Family Faculty Fellow; received 2014 John Bates Clark Medal
 Austan Goolsbee, economics advisor to US President Barack Obama, Fulbright Scholar researching Internet taxation in the US and European Union, and New York Times economics columnist.
 Randall Kroszner, professor of economics, former member of the Federal Reserve Board of Governors (2006–2009)
 Steven Levitt, economist, author of Freakonomics, John Bates Clark Medal recipient and director of the Becker Center on Chicago Price Theory 
 John A. List, economist, pioneer in the field of experimental economics
 Merton Miller, Nobel Prize–winning economist
 Toby Moskowitz, Fischer Black Prize winning financial economist.
 Kevin M. Murphy, economist, John Bates Clark Medal recipient and MacArthur Fellow
 Raghuram Rajan, appointed Governor of the Reserve Bank of India, honorary adviser to Indian Prime Minister Manmohan Singh, former chief economist of the International Monetary Fund, winner of the Fischer Black Prize and co-author (with Luigi Zingales) of "Saving Capitalism From The Capitalists"
Richard N. Rosett, former dean, chairman of the National Bureau of Economic Research and mentor of Nobel Prize winner Richard Thaler
 Myron Scholes, Nobel Prize–winning economist, co-originator of the Black–Scholes options pricing model (also alumnus, M.B.A. and Ph.D.)
 George Shultz, economist and former dean, also former U.S. Secretary of Labor, U.S. Secretary of the Treasury, and U.S. Secretary of State
Jeremy Siegel, Professor of Finance at the Wharton School of the University of Pennsylvania, creator of the Siegel's paradox
 Richard Thaler, Nobel Prize-winning behavioral economist, considered "father of behavioral finance", cited as significant influence on bridging psychology and economics in decision models by Daniel Kahneman (2002 Nobel laureate in Economics)
 George S. Tolley, agriculture and resource economist (also alumnus; MA, PhD 1955)
 W. Allen Wallis, former dean

Strategic management
 James O. McKinsey, founder of McKinsey & Company in 1926, pioneered budgeting as a management tool
 Ronald S. Burt, professor of sociology and strategy, known for his study of brokerage in social networks and the social structure of competitive advantage; author of Brokerage and Closure: An Introduction to Social Capital
 James E. Schrager, Clinical Professor of Entrepreneurship and Strategic Management, teaches New Venture Strategy. Expert on New Venure Strategy and how it differs from Corporate Strategy.
 Linda E. Ginzel, Clinical Professor of Managerial Behavior, teaches New Venture Strategy. Child product safety advocate and founder of Kids In Danger.

Private equity
 Luigi Zingales, professor of entrepreneurial finance and private equity, and co-author (with Raghuram Rajan) of "Saving Capitalism From The Capitalists"
 Scott Meadow, clinical professor of entrepreneurship and faculty director of global initiatives
 Steven Kaplan, the Neubauer Family professor of entrepreneurship and finance

Econometrics and Statistics
 Bryon Aragam, Assistant Professor of Econometrics and Statistics and Robert H. Topel Faculty Scholar
 David K.A. Mordecai, Adjunct Professor of Econometrics and Statistics
 Nicholas Polson, Robert Law, Jr. Professor of Econometrics and Statistics
 Veronika Rockova, Professor of Econometrics and Statistics, and James S. Kemper Foundation Faculty Scholar
 Jeffrey R. Russell, Alper Family Professor of Econometrics and Statistics
 Ruey S. Tsay, H.G.B. Alexander Professor of Econometrics and Statistics Emeritus

See also
 University of Chicago Booth School of Business
 List of University of Chicago Booth School of Business alumni
 List of University of Chicago people

References

University of Chicago Booth School of Business faculty